Daro may refer to:

Daro District
Daro (state constituency), represented in the Sarawak State Legislative Assembly
Daro language, a dialect of an Austronesian language spoken in Sarawak

See also
Darro (disambiguation)